Baarish is a 1957 Indian Hindi-language crime drama film with Dev Anand and Nutan in the lead roles. Based on the American film On the Waterfront, it is the directorial debut of Shankar Mukherjee.

Plot
Ramu is a young carefree man who raises pigeons. One day, he experiences the shock of his life when his best friend Gopal is murdered. For Ramu, one thing is certain, that he wants revenge.

From a stooge, Ramu learns that behind Gopal's death is a gangster, "Boss". Even as Ramu is in love with his another friend Mohan's sister Chanda, he wants to take revenge for the killing. Even on the wedding night, the opportunity to meet boss can not be missed by Ramu.

After several twists and with the help of Mohan, they manage to outsmart Boss aka Bihari. Now Ramu can finally devote himself to his wife Chanda, who is expecting their first child.

Cast
 Dev Anand as Ramu
 Nutan as Chanda
 Lalita Pawar as Chanda & Mohan's Mother
 Anwar Hussain as Mohan
 Nana Palsikar as Gopal
 Gope as Lachchu
 Kumkum as Kamli
 Jagdish Sethi as Bihari / Boss
 Madan Puri as Hariya
 Mehmood as Ramu's Neighbour 
 Helen as Dancer
 Samson as Captain
 Kundan as Neighbour, Eve teaser
 Narbada Shankar as Old neighbour

Music

Music was by C Ramchandra. Lyrics for all songs were written by Rajinder Krishan

Trivia
 In the song "Surat Ho To Aisi Ho", a typical Goan folk style lines are sung by Francis Vaz, father of Franco Vaz (Musician drummer who worked a lot with RD Burman)

 The first line of song "Phir Wahi Chand Wahi Hum Wahi Tanhai Hai" are quite similar to the song "Phir Wahi Sham, Wahi Gham, Wahi Tanhai Hai" from the movie Jahan Ara (1964) music by Madan Mohan.

References

External links
 

1950s Hindi-language films
Films scored by C. Ramchandra
Indian black-and-white films
1957 films
Indian films about revenge
Indian crime drama films